Hugh Griffiths, Baron Griffiths (1923–2015), judge
 Brian Griffiths, Baron Griffiths of Fforestfach (born 1941), Conservative peer
 Leslie Griffiths (born 1942), Labour peer